Youth Dinner is a 2017 Chinese youth romance film based on the novel Six People's Dinner by Lu Min. It stars Shawn Dou, Janine Chang, Wu Gang and Vivian Wu. The film was released in China on June 16, 2017.

Synopsis
Set during the 1990s in Yunnan, the film revolves around two single-parent families and the love story between six individuals.

Cast 
Shawn Dou
Janine Chang
Wu Gang (actor)
Vivian Wu 
Zhao Lixin
Yu Haoming
Yin Xinzi
Chen Jiang
Cui Wenlu
Chen Huan
Hu Jingjun
Chen Weixu
Hao Xuankai
Li Yunuo

Awards

References

External links
 

2017 films
Films set in the 1990s
Chinese romantic drama films
Films based on Chinese novels
Films set in Yunnan
2017 romantic drama films
2010s Mandarin-language films